Sarel Petrus Marais (born 16 March 1989) is a South African professional rugby union player for the  in Super Rugby and  in the Currie Cup. His position he plays is Fullback.

Career

Youth and Varsity rugby

Marais also played for the  team during the 2010 Under-21 competition.

Leopards

Kings

He remained with them for three seasons, making 36 appearances for them in the Currie Cup and Vodacom Cup competitions in 2011 and 2012. He reached the top ten in the scoring charts for the 2011 Currie Cup First Division, scoring ten tries and two conversions during the season. He firmly established himself as the first choice full-back, starting fifteen of their sixteen matches in the 2012 Currie Cup First Division season and also started their match in the First Division final, which the Kings won 26–25 to win their second First Division title in three seasons.

In 2013, Marais was also named in the  squad for the 2013 Super Rugby season. After starting the first three matches of the season, he missed the next seven due to a knee injury.

Sharks

He was also in the starting fifteen for the Currie Cup final, which the Sharks won 33–19 against .

Return to Kings

At the end of 2015, Marais was one of a number of players that joined the Southern Kings prior to their return to Super Rugby for the 2016 season. However, the  – the provincial union that was supposed to administer the Super Rugby team – suffered serious financial problems and the South African Rugby Union stepped in to assist the Super Rugby franchise; however, Marais was not one of the players contracted by SARU to represent the Southern Kings. After being unpaid for several months, he was one of eighteen players involved in submitting an application to get Eastern Province Rugby liquidated in an attempt to recoup unpaid salary payments.

Bulls

Shortly after the 2016 Super Rugby season kicked off, Marais joined the Pretoria-based  on a two-month trial basis.

Stormers / Western Province

At the start of 2017, Marais moved to Cape Town, where he joined the  Super Rugby team and the  Currie Cup team.

References

South African rugby union players
Eastern Province Elephants players
Southern Kings players
Stormers players
Sharks (rugby union) players
Rugby union fullbacks
Alumni of Paarl Boys' High School
Living people
1989 births
Sharks (Currie Cup) players
Bulls (rugby union) players
Western Province (rugby union) players
Yokohama Canon Eagles players
Rugby union wings
Rugby union players from Cape Town